Dognina is a genus of moths of the family Notodontidae.

Selected species
Dognina honeyi Miller, 2011
Dognina veltini (Dognin, 1890)

References

Notodontidae